Three Worms and an Orchestra is a DVD of a performance of the Canadian comedy music group The Arrogant Worms with the Edmonton Symphony Orchestra. It includes their most popular songs performed live, as well as two music videos.

The original, and heavily edited, version of this performance aired on Bravo! Canada. The Arrogant Worms also released a related CD, Semi-Conducted, with most of the tracks on it.

The Arrogant Worms albums